Michael F. Fahey III  is a United States Marine Corps major general who has served as the Commanding General of the 4th Marine Division since October 2020. Previously, he served as the Commander of the Marine Corps Forces South from August 2018 to September 2020.

References

External links

Year of birth missing (living people)
Living people
Place of birth missing (living people)
University of San Diego alumni
Harvard Extension School alumni
Recipients of the Legion of Merit
United States Marine Corps generals
Recipients of the Defense Superior Service Medal